Sir Francis Drake (aka The Adventures of Sir Francis Drake) is a 1961–1962 British adventure television series starring Terence Morgan as Sir Francis Drake, commander of the sailing ship the Golden Hind.  As well as battles at sea and sword fights, the series also deals with intrigue at Queen Elizabeth's court.

Production

The series was a joint ABC/ATV production, made at Associated British Elstree Studios and on historical sites in England.

A replica of the Golden Hind was constructed at a cost of £25,000 and was used for filming in and around the bays of Torbay and Dartmouth.  In 1963 the ship was permanently moored in Brixham harbour in Devon where it became a tourist attraction. The ship was destroyed in a storm in 1987, after which it was towed to Dartmouth and replaced with the current replica.

Additional production staff
Historical research was provided by E. Hayter Preston.  Beatrice Dawson designed the many period costumes worn in the show.  Ian Stuart Black was story editor.  The fight scenes were arranged by Peter Diamond, who also appeared in four episodes.

Broadcast history
The series was originally shown on UK network ATV from 12 November 1961, until 20 May 1962.  It later aired in the US on NBC from 24 June 1962, to 9 September 1962 as a summer replacement for Car 54, Where Are You?. In 2020, it began being broadcast on Talking Pictures TV.

Cast and characters
 Terence Morgan as Sir Francis Drake
 Jean Kent as Queen Elizabeth I
 Michael Crawford as John Drake
 Roger Delgado as Count Bernardino de Mendoza
 Patrick McLoughlin as Trevelyan
 Alex Scott as Don Pedro
 Milton Reid as Diego
 Richard Warner as Walsingham
 Ewan Roberts as Munro
 Howard Lang as Richard Grenville
 Glynn Edwards as Will Martin
 Peter Diamond as Bosun

Guest appearances

David McCallum as Lord Oakeshott
Delphi Lawrence as the Countess
Raymond Huntley as Dr John Dee
Noelle Middleton as Mary Queen of Scots
Michael Anderson Jr. as John Harington
Clive Morton as English Ambassador
Ronald Leigh-Hunt as Hawkins
Nanette Newman as Yana
Olive McFarland as Jenny Smellitt
Michael Ripper as Almighty Jones
Mark Eden as Agila
Anthony Bushell as Tom Doughty
Frederick Jaeger as Vicary
William Lucas as Count Julio
Neil McCallum as Sir Martin
Francesca Annis as Mariella of Naples
Ferdy Mayne as Joos
Mary Merrall as Duchess
Nigel Davenport as Miguel de Cervantes
Reginald Beckwith as Sir Henry Rainsford
Brian Bedford as Estaban
Barry Morse as Governor
Pamela Brown as Catherine de' Medici
Patrick Allen as Henry of Navarre
Natasha Parry as Countess Inez

Episode list
Airdate is for ATV London ITV regions varied date and order.

DVD release
The complete series is out on DVD and includes a still showing Terence Morgan as Sir Francis Drake playing bowls, alluding to the famous incident when the Spanish Armada was sighted.

References

 Alex McNeil, Total Television. New York City: Penguin Books, 1984 ed.

External links
 

Television series by ITC Entertainment
British adventure television series
British drama television series
1960s British drama television series
1961 British television series debuts
1962 British television series endings
Cultural depictions of Elizabeth I
Cultural depictions of Francis Drake
Television shows shot at Associated British Studios
NBC original programming
Television set in Tudor England
Black-and-white British television shows
English-language television shows